Lal Bahadur Shastri National Academy of Administration (LBSNAA) is a  civil service training institute on public policy and public administration in Musoorie, Uttarakhand in India. The academy's main purpose is to train civil servants of the IAS cadre and also  conduct the Foundation Course of Group-A Central Civil Services. After completion of training, the trainee officers of IAS cadre are awarded an MA (Public administration) from Jawaharlal Nehru University, Delhi. It has been functioning under the Ministry of Personnel, Public Grievances and Pensions since 1985.

Overview

On 15 April 1958, the then Union Home Minister Pandit Govind Ballabh Pant announced in the Lok Sabha, that the Government would set up a National Academy of Administration, where training would be given to all the recruits of the Civil Services. The Ministry of Home Affairs also decided to amalgamate the IAS Training School, Delhi and the IAS Staff College, Shimla to form a National Academy of Administration to be set up in Mussoorie in 1959. The Academy underwent two names changes. In October 1972, it was renamed as Lal Bahadur Shastri Academy of Administration and the institution got its present name of Lal Badhur Shastri National Academy of Administration (LBSNAA) in July 1973. The training of first batch of officers started at Metcalf House in Delhi on 13 April 1959 with 115 officers. In September 1959, the academy shifted to Charleville Hotel in Mussoorie which had been the first hotel to be built in this hill station. The hotel was purchased by the government from private hands.

Originally, the main building of the hotel was built in 1854 by General Wilkinson and was purchased by Mr. Hobson, a retired manager of Mussorrie Bank, in 1861. In 1905, Queen Mary of the UK, then titled the Princess of Wales, had stayed in the hotel. The writer Rudyard Kipling stayed at the hotel in 1888. In 1984, a fire destroyed the main hotel building.

The academy functioned from its inception through 31 October 1970 under Home Ministry, moving to another ministry until April 1977, and then again under the Home Ministry until March 1985. From April 1985 on, the academy has functioned under the Ministry of Personnel, Public Grievances and Pensions. In 1988, the academy established the National Informatics Centre Training Unit (NICTU). In 1989, the academy established the National Society for Promotion of Development Administration Research and Training (NSDART), now known as the National Institute of Administration Research (NIAR).

In India, most officers of the premier civil services of the country are selected through competitive Civil Services Examinations administered by the Union Public Service Commission. Applicants who are accepted attend LBSNAA for a four-month Foundation Course. In this course, the feeling of "equality" among all the trainees is introduced.

After this, officers of the Indian Administrative Service continue their professional training at the academy, while officers of other services proceed to respective staff colleges, such as the Sushma Swaraj Institute of Foreign Service in New Delhi for Indian Foreign Service officers. Sardar Vallabhbhai Patel National Police Academy in Hyderabad for Indian Police Service officers and the Indira Gandhi National Forest Academy in Dehradun for Indian Forest Service officers, National Academy of Customs Indirect Taxes and Narcotics for Indian Revenue Service officers, etc.

The academy also began conducting Mid-Career Training Programs for officers of the Indian Administrative Service in 2007. Officers with about 15 years of service who are due to become Joint Secretaries undergo the Phase IV Mid-Career Training Program, while officers with about eight years of service undergo the Phase III Mid-Career Training Program. To provide the most comprehensive knowledge base for training, the academy is working with world-renowned think tanks and Ivy League research institutions. In conjunction with the partnerships with Google, the academy introduced training in the latest technologies. This helped trainees gain insight into the most recent innovations in the field. The academy also conducts a number of short-duration training programs in various aspects of governance and public administration.

The academy is assisted in research in areas of governance and public administration by a number of research centers, some of them having an autonomous status. The most important research center of the academy is the National Institute of Administrative Research headed by an executive director. The academy also has the Center for Disaster Management, the Centre for Rural Studies, the Gender Centre, and the Centre for Rural Credit.

Facilities
The newly constructed Aadharshila and Gyanshila buildings have faculty and staff offices, and computer and lecture halls. Sampoornanand Auditorium is the largest central hall used for cultural programs and functions. Indira Bhavan campus about 1 km from the main campus hosts the short-term programs.

The academy has a large sports complex, a library, computer facilities and Wi-Fi, and several hostels for resident students.

Directors
The table chronicles the list of Directors of LBSNAA since its inception in 1959.

See also
Administrative Staff College of India
Indian Institute of Public Administration

References

External links

Official website

Public administration schools in India
Memorials to Lal Bahadur Shastri
Education in Dehradun district
Mussoorie